Wampum Run is a tributary of the Beaver River in western Pennsylvania.  The stream rises in south-central Lawrence County and flows northeast entering the Beaver River at Wampum, Pennsylvania. The watershed is roughly 11% agricultural, 83% forested and the rest is other uses.

References

Rivers of Pennsylvania
Tributaries of the Beaver River
Rivers of Lawrence County, Pennsylvania